Liberty is an unincorporated community in Halifax County, Virginia, United States, near Nathalie. It lies at an elevation of 680 feet (186 m).

References

Unincorporated communities in Halifax County, Virginia
Unincorporated communities in Virginia